Aljoša is a Serbo-Croatian given name, a diminutive of Aleksej and Aleksije. It may refer to:

Aljoša Kunac (born 1980), Croatian water polo player
Aljoša Žorga (born 1947), Slovenian former basketballer
Aljoša Vojnović (born 1985), Croatian footballer
Aljoša Štefanič (born 1982), Slovenian handballer
Aljoša Buha (1962–1986), Bosnian rock musician
Aljoša Asanović (born 1965), retired Croatian footballer
Aljoša Josić (1921-2011), French architect
Aljoša Čampara (born 1975), Bosnian politician

See also
Alyosha

Serbian masculine given names
Croatian masculine given names